Bradley Michael Pierce is an American actor, producer and cinematographer.  Along with other roles and bit parts in television, films, direct-to-video animation, advertising, and video games, he played Peter Shepherd in Jumanji, the original voice of Chip in Beauty and the Beast, one of the original voices for Tails from the Sonic the Hedgehog franchise and Pete Lender in the 1997 film adaptation of The Borrowers.

Career
Pierce began acting at age six, and has since appeared in various projects ranging from commercial and voiceover to television and film. He played the role of Andrew Shawn Donovan IV on Days of Our Lives for just over a year. He is also known for voicing Chip in Disney's Beauty and the Beast as well as Flounder in the television series The Little Mermaid and Tails in the Saturday morning cartoon series Sonic the Hedgehog.

Other roles include Peter in Jumanji and a starring role in The Borrowers with John Goodman. Pierce provided additional voices in The Busy World of Richard Scarry and appeared with Patty Duke and Melissa Gilbert in the TV film Cries from the Heart/Touch of Truth as an autistic child named Michael.

He has guest-starred on such TV shows including Life Goes On, Roseanne, Herman's Head, Mad About You, Lois & Clark: The New Adventures of Superman, Touched by an Angel, Profiler, Star Trek: Voyager, and voiced the character Nibs in the 2002 film Return to Never Land.

In addition to acting, Bradley is producing short films and new media "Geek" content with the production company "ZFO Entertainment", a company he started with his good friend and fellow actor Joey Zimmerman. They are primarily working as a press/media outlet, in addition to producing their own short film content. Their first short film "Vultures" is slated for release late 2016.

Outside of film-making, Bradley is the co-founder of Pierce & Luna, a cocktail community geared towards bartending education and liquor reviews. Along with his partner, Bella Luna, Pierce has begun providing bartending services and consultations for elite parties. They also provide custom speciality cocktails for festivals such as the Hollywood Burlesque Festival and the Hollywood Fringe Festival.

Personal life
Pierce and his wife Shari Holmes were married in 2005, together they have three children. Holmes filed for divorce from Pierce in 2015, and was finalized in 2017.

Filmography

Film
 Too Young to Die (1990, TV Movie) - Web
 Cartel (1990) - Tommy (uncredited)
 Beauty and the Beast (1991) - Chip (voice)
 Chaplin (1992) - Sydney Chaplin Jr. (age 8)
 Porco Rosso (1992) - Gas Boy (English version, voice)
 Man's Best Friend (1993) - Chet
 Cries from the Heart aka Touch of Truth (1994, TV Movie) - Michael Barth^
 Thumbilena (1994) - Lil'Abee (voice)
 Whisper of the Heart (1995) - High School Student (voice)
 Jumanji (1995) - Peter Shepherd
 Amanda (1996) - Medieval Boy
 The Undercover Kid (1996) - Max Anderson
 The Borrowers (1997) - Pete Lender
 Doom Runners (1997, TV Movie) - Adam
 Down to You (2000) - Ricky James
 Return to Never Land (2002) - Nibs (voice)
 The Cat Returns (2002) - Additional voices
 Deacon (2018) - Lt. Linus Carter

Television
 Life Goes On (1990) - Boy
 Beverly Hills 90210 (1991) - Drew
 Roseanne (1991) - Jason
 Shaky Ground (1992-1993) - Dylan Moody
 Herman's Head (1993) - Brad
 Mad About You (1993) - Jed
 The Little Mermaid (1993-1994) - Flounder / Crabscout #3 (voices)
 Sonic the Hedgehog (1993-1994) - Miles 'Tails' Prower (voice)
 The Pink Panther (1993-1995) - Buddy Bimmel's Son (voice)
 The Busy World of Richard Scarry (1994-1997) - Various Voices voice)
 The Pinocchio Shop (1995–1997) - Pinocchio (voice)
 The Oz Kids (1996) - Boris (voice)
 Touched by an Angel (1997) - Hank Monroe
 Mr. Show with Bob and David (1998) - Young Otto
 Profiler (1999) - Jeff
 Star Trek: Voyager (1999, season 5, Episode 23: "11:59") - Jason Janeway
 Chicken Soup for the Soul (1999) - Trip
 As Told by Ginger (2000) - Darren Patterson (voice)
 The Wild Thornberrys (2000) - Shango (voice)

Video games
 Tony Hawk's American Wasteland (2005)
 Kingdom Hearts II (2005)
 Kingdom Hearts II: Final Mix+ (2007)
 The Lego Movie Videogame (2014) - Good Cop / Bad Cop

Production credits

Producer
 Andy the Android Dick (8 episodes)
 Fighting Fortey-Eight (Associate producer)
 Blind (Producer)
 Vultures (Co-executive producer)
 March Made in Arkham (Producer)
 Deacon (Producer)

Camera work
Finding Forty-Eight (2015) (Lighting)
Deacon (2018) (Camera operator)

References

External links

ZFO Entertainment

Living people
American male child actors
American male film actors
American male television actors
American male video game actors
Place of birth missing (living people)
American male voice actors
20th-century American male actors
21st-century American male actors
Male actors from Arizona
1982 births